Phlebodium areolatum, the Virginia blue fern, is a species of epiphytic fern in the family Polypodiaceae. It is native to the New World Tropics and Subtropics; Mexico, Florida, some of the Caribbean islands, Central America, and South America to Argentina, and has been introduced to India. As its synonym Phlebodium pseudoaureum it has gained the Royal Horticultural Society's Award of Garden Merit.

References

Polypodiaceae
Ferns of the Americas
Flora of Florida
Flora of Mexico
Flora of Central America
Flora of the Dominican Republic
Flora of Haiti
Flora of Jamaica
Flora of the Leeward Islands
Flora of Puerto Rico
Flora of Trinidad and Tobago
Flora of northern South America
Flora of western South America
Flora of Brazil
Flora of Paraguay
Flora of Northeast Argentina
Flora of Northwest Argentina
Plants described in 1841
Flora without expected TNC conservation status